Public water supply and sanitation in the United Kingdom is characterised by universal access and generally good service quality. A salient feature of the sector in the United Kingdom compared to other developed countries is the diversity of institutional arrangements between the constituting parts of the UK (England and Wales; Scotland; and Northern Ireland), which are each described in separate articles, while this article is devoted to some common issues across the United Kingdom.

Access 

Access to improved water supply and sanitation in the UK is universal. In 2015, 100% of the population had access to improved water supply and 99% of the population had access to "improved" sanitation.

Source: WHO/UNICEF Joint Monitoring Program (2008)

Water sources 
According to the Environment Agency, total water abstraction for public water supply in the UK was 16,406 megalitres per day in 2007. Groundwater contributes 30 per cent of public supply water in England. In Wales and Scotland groundwater provides about five per cent of public supply. The majority of the UK's abstraction of surface water is from reservoirs, where rainwater is transported via rivers and streams and contained in an artificial or natural lake until it is required.

Responsibility for water supply and sanitation

Policy and regulation 

In England and Wales the economic regulator of water companies is the Water Services Regulation Authority (Ofwat). The Environment Agency is responsible for environmental regulation, and the Drinking Water Inspectorate for regulating drinking water quality. The economic water industry regulator in Scotland is the Water Industry Commission for Scotland and the environmental regulator is the Scottish Environment Protection Agency.  Drinking water standards and wastewater discharge standards in the UK, as in other countries of the European Union, were determined by the EU (see Water supply and sanitation in the European Union) before Brexit.

Service provision 

In England and Wales water and sewerage services are provided by 10 private regional water and sewerage companies and 13 mostly smaller private "water only" companies. In Scotland water and sewerage services are provided by a single public company, Scottish Water. In Northern Ireland water and sewerage services are also provided by a single public entity, Northern Ireland Water.

Employment 
Total employment by UK water companies amounted to 41,000 full-time equivalent jobs in 2012/13, according to an analysis by the consulting firm Deloitte. In addition, 86,000 jobs were supported indirectly.

Financial aspects

Tariffs 

According to a 2006 survey by NUS consulting the average water tariff (price) without sewerage in the U.K. for large consumers was the equivalent of US$1.90 per cubic metre. This was the third-highest tariff among the 14 mostly OECD countries covered by the report.

Metering 

A particularity of water tariffs in the U.K. is the low share of metering. Most users are not billed on a volumetric basis and have no financial incentive for water conservation. Since the 1990s efforts have been made to increase the share of household metering, which reached 33% in 2008. The Environment Agency would like to see 75% of households metered by 2025. The Fairness on Tap coalition (including National Trust, Waterwise, WWF and RSPB) is calling for the government to set out a strategy to install water meters in at least 80% of England where there is the greatest pressure on the freshwater environment and people's pockets, by 2020. Studies show that water meters lead to a 5-15% reduction in household water use.

Ownership 
A 2022 study, found that over 70% of the English water industry is in foreign hands (foreign ownership).

UK wide Fibre in Water 
In 2021, the UK Government Department for Digital, Culture, Media & Sport launched an open competition called 'Fibre in Water' to explore the potential for delivering  broadband and mobile phone services via drinking water mains.

Environmental criticisms 
In July 2011, the think tank Policy Exchange reported a significant decline in river quality due to abstraction carried out by water companies. The report calls for water companies to be charged more for using the most environmentally vulnerable rivers and aquifers in drier parts of the country, with cheaper rates where water is more abundant. It also called for higher water charges during droughts.

In 2009, an investigation conducted by the BBC's Panorama concluded that the operation of more than 20,000 Combined Sewer Overflow pipes (CSO) was leading to the routine spillage of untreated wastes around Britain's coastline, potentially leading to very dirty water around some of the most popular beaches in the UK. The CSOs, intended for use in very rare occasions, were not covered by the existing legislation for waste emissions.

See also 

EU water policy
Water Framework Directive
Water supply and sanitation in England and Wales
Water supply and sanitation in Gibraltar
Water supply and sanitation in Scotland
Water supply and sanitation in Northern Ireland

References

External links 
 Water UK
 Environment Agency 's water quality website
 Water Resources Management in Cooperation with Agriculture project